Maria De Fatima Acosta (born ) is a Peruvian female volleyball player, playing as a libero. She is part of the Peru women's national volleyball team. On club level she played for Club Deportivo Geminis in 2014.

References

External links
 Profile at FIVB.org

1992 births
Living people
Peruvian women's volleyball players
Place of birth missing (living people)
21st-century Peruvian women